Thyas arcifera is a moth of the family Noctuidae first described by George Hampson in 1913. It is found in eastern Africa, including South Africa.

External links

Ophiusina
Moths of Africa
Moths described in 1913